Dr. Krishnamoorthy Rajannaidu (Tamil: கிருஷ்ணா மூர்த்தி) is a Malaysian politician. He is the elected representatives the seat of Bukit Selambau in the Kedah State Legislative Assembly. Krishnamoorty is a Doctor in professional.

Election results

References

Living people
Malaysian politicians of Indian descent
Members of the Kedah State Legislative Assembly
People's Justice Party (Malaysia) politicians
Year of birth missing (living people)